Deh-e Alireza or Deh Alireza or Dehalireza may refer to:
 Deh-e Alireza, Khuzestan